Amorality is an absence of, indifference towards, disregard for, or incapacity for morality. Some simply refer to it as a case of not being moral or immoral. Amoral should not be confused with immoral, which refers to an agent doing or thinking something they know or believe to be wrong.

Morality and amorality in humans and other animals is a subject of dispute among scientists and philosophers. If morality is intrinsic to humanity, then amoral human beings either do not exist or are only deficiently human, a condition sometimes described as moral idiocy or anti-social behavior disorder. On the other hand, if morality is extrinsic to humanity, then amoral human beings can both exist and be fully human, and as such be amoral by default.

Human capabilities may be thought of as amoral in that they can be used for either constructive or destructive purposes, i.e. for good or for ill.

There is a position that claims that amorality is just another form of morality or a concept that is close to it, citing the cases of moral naturalism, moral constructivism, moral relativism, and moral fictionalism as varieties that resemble key aspects of amorality.

Inanimate objects 
One may consider any entity that is not sapient amoral. For example, a rock may be used (by rational agents) for good or bad purposes, but the rock itself is neither good nor bad. In ontological philosophy, the ancient gnostic concept that the material world was inherently evil applied morality to existence itself and was a point of concern in early Christianity in the form of Docetism, as it opposed the notion that creation is good, as stated in The Book of Genesis. In modern science, however, the matter of the universe is often observed amorally for objective purposes.

Nonhuman animals 
Nonhuman animals have long been thought to be amoral entities. However, research into the evolution of morality, including sociality and altruism in nonhuman animals, has sparked new debate amongst many philosophers. Many nonhuman animals display behavior that is analogous to human moral behavior, such as caring for the young, protecting kin, and sharing the spoils of the hunt. Generally speaking, if this behavior is a voluntary response to ethical norms, then nonhuman animals do have morality. If nonhuman animals are involuntarily following innate instinct, then they are amoral.

Legal entities 
Corporations, to some, are thought to be amoral entities. This can refer to the "ethical numbness" of these organizations' executives and managers, especially when approached from the view that corporations can be considered moral agents as well as a kind of legal person.

See also
Capacity (law)
Moral nihilism
Moral psychology
Anomie
Apathy
Value judgment

References

 
Concepts in ethics